Maiestas akashiensis is a species of bug from the Cicadellidae family that is endemic to Japan. It was formerly placed within Recilia, but a 2009 revision moved it to Maiestas.

References

Insects described in 1914
Endemic fauna of Japan
Insects of Japan
Maiestas